Badur may refer to:

Sezer Badur (b. 1984), German footballer
Badur, Iran, a village in Tehran Province